Coniophanes dromiciformis, Peters's running snake, is a species of snake in the family Colubridae. The species is native to Ecuador and Peru.

References

Coniophanes
Snakes of South America
Reptiles described in 1863
Reptiles of Ecuador
Reptiles of Peru
Taxa named by Wilhelm Peters